Peu may refer to:

Peu (footballer), a Brazilian footballer
Peu (futsal player), a Portuguese international futsal player
Lawrence Peu (born 1966), a South African long-distance runner
Stéphane Peu, a French politician, member of the French Communist Party

See also
Peu difficile, a French grade for climbing routes